Lucien Jean-Baptiste (born 6 May 1964) is a French actor, writer and director.

Life and career
He is the French voice in films starring Chris Rock, Don Cheadle, Martin Lawrence and Ice Cube. His voice is also heard in movies with Terrence Howard, Will Smith, Kevin Hart, Jamie Foxx and Anthony Mackie.

Theater

Filmography

Actor

Director / Writer

References

External links
 

1978 births
Living people
French people of Martiniquais descent
French male film actors
French male television actors
French comedians
Actors from Rouen
Cours Florent alumni
21st-century French male actors
20th-century French male actors
French male stage actors
Film people from Rouen